Several coup d'etats or similar events have occurred in Afghanistan since its modern foundation in 1919.

Assassination of King Habibullāh Kalakāni in 1929, in which Kalakani was captured by Mohammed Nadir Shah's forces and hanged
1973 coup, which ousted King Mohammed Zahir Shah and the monarchy and created a republic led by Mohammed Daoud Khan
December 1976 coup attempt, a coup plotted by Mir Ahmad Shah Rizwani that was foiled by Daoud Khan's government
Saur Revolution of 1978, the violent coup or 'revolution' that ousted Daoud Khan and created a communist republic led by PDPA general secretary Nur Muhammad Taraki
Assassination of PDPA general secretary Nur Muhammad Taraki in 1979, in which Taraki was suffocated under the orders of fellow Khalq communist Hafizullah Amin, though this was covered up to the public
Assassination of PDPA general secretary Amin in 1979, when the Soviet Union intervened and killed General Secretary Amin
1990 coup attempt, a failed coup attempted by hardline Khalqist Shahnawaz Tanai against President Mohammad Najibullah
April 2002 coup attempt, an unfoiled coup plot by members of hardline Islamist Gulbuddin Hekmatyar's Hezbi Islami against Afghan Interim Administration leader Hamid Karzai, which included killing former Afghan king Mohammed Zahir Shah on his planned return to Afghanistan

Political history of Afghanistan
 
Coups d'état